Fort Garland is an unincorporated town, a post office, and a census-designated place (CDP) located in and governed by Costilla County, Colorado, United States. The Fort Garland post office has the ZIP Code 81133. At the United States Census 2010, the population of the Fort Garland CDP was 433, while the population of the 81133 ZIP Code Tabulation Area was 840 including adjacent areas.

History
Fort Garland was established by the US Army in June 1858 to protect settlers from the Utes in the San Luis Valley, which was then part of the New Mexico Territory. The fort was abandoned in 1883 following the confinement of the tribes to Indian reservation in Utah territory and Colorado. The Fort Garland Museum preserves some of the historic buildings from the fort.

Geography

Fort Garland is at the crossroads of U.S. Route 160 and Colorado State Highway 159, which leads south towards Taos and Santa Fe, New Mexico.

Demographics

Modern amenities

Fort Garland is referred to as the "Gateway to the San Luis Valley", as it is the first town one encounters when traveling west having crossed over La Veta Pass in the Sangre de Cristo Range. Fort Garland is home to many artists, painters, crafters and internationally known musicians.

Fort Garland has a business district with two motels, several restaurants, the Old Fort Market grocery store, the Fort Garland Museum, two gas stations, two recreational marijuana shops, a car wash, hair salon, campgrounds, hardware store, liquor store, and multiple shops featuring collectibles and antiquities as well as a Wild West show.

The Annual Fort Garland Band Jam Music Festival features local and regional musicians, as well as nationally and internationally recognized musical talent. This summer event, usually held in mid-July, includes an open-air market, local food vendors offering up traditional and regional cuisine, a beer garden, and children's activities. The music offered covers numerous styles, from traditional Spanish guitar to R&B to rock and roll.

The Blanca/Fort Garland Community Center is open to residents and the public on daily, monthly or annual fees.

The Entrada Visitor's Center offers information on local and regional points of interest, such as the Great Sand Dunes, the Colorado 'Gator farm, UFO Watchtower and other activities located within the San Luis Valley.

See also

Outline of Colorado
Index of Colorado-related articles
State of Colorado
Colorado cities and towns
Colorado census designated places
Colorado counties
Costilla County, Colorado
Fort Garland
Old Spanish Trail
Spanish Fort

References

External links

Fort Garland @ Colorado.com
Fort Garland @ UncoverColorado.com
Fort Garland @ Sangres.com
Fort Garland Museum & Cultural Center
Fort Garland @ ColoradoEncyclopedia.org
Fort Garland @ ArmyHistory.org
Costilla County website

Census-designated places in Costilla County, Colorado
Census-designated places in Colorado
Hispanic and Latino American history
1858 establishments in New Mexico Territory